William Robert Harvey (born January 29, 1941, Brewton, Alabama) is an American educator, academic administrator, and businessman who served as president of Hampton University from 1978 to 2022. He is the longest serving president in the school's history. Harvey became the first African-American owner in the soft drink bottling industry when he and his wife, Norma Baker Harvey, purchased a Pepsi-Cola Bottling Company franchise together in 1986.

On December 15, 2020, He announced his plans to retire as President of Hampton University by June 2022. He officially retired on June 30, 2022, after serving nearly 44 consecutive years as president.

See also
Dr. William R. Harvey Museum of Art

References 

1941 births
People from Brewton, Alabama
Living people
Hampton University faculty
Talladega College alumni
Virginia State University alumni
Harvard University faculty
American academic administrators
Presidents of Hampton University
Educators from Alabama
Academics from Alabama
African-American businesspeople
Harvard University alumni
Harvard University administrators
21st-century African-American people
20th-century African-American people